Panay is a small island in the Philippines, located northwest of Catanduanes Island in the Bicol Region. It is often confused with the much larger Panay Island in Western Visayas. The island is politically under the province of Catanduanes and subdivided between the municipalities of Bagamanoc and Panganiban.

See also

 List of islands of the Philippines

Islands of Catanduanes